João de Castilho (1470–1552), also known as Juan de Castillo (Merindad de Trasmiera, Cantabria, c. 1470 — c. 1552),  was a Castilian and a notable Iberian architect born in Castillo Siete Villas, actually Arnuero (Cantabria). He is recognisably one of the premier architects in Portuguese history (where he developed most of his work), responsible for several World Heritage buildings. He was a Spanish-Portuguese master builder and architect originally from Cantabria (former Kingdom of Castile; present-day Spain), who developed his mature career in Portugal, where he settled in c.1508. He is considered the greatest Portuguese architect of the 16th century and one of the greatest in Renaissance Europe.

Trained in the gothic style, his activity made its mark during the Manueline period, after which he played a decisive role in affirming the Renaissance style in Portugal. João de Castilho was one of the major protagonists of a decise shift towards classicism. His career also highlights the gradual promotion of the position of master mason (medieval) to that of architect – in the modern sense of the word –, with the corresponding recognition and rise in social status.

Author of a vast and notable body of built work, João de Castilho is linked to the building of five historic monuments classified by UNESCO as World Heritage, two great highlights being the Jerónimos Monastery and the Convent of Christ. Among many other works for which he was responsible, he also contributed to the Alcobaça Monastery, the Batalha Monastery and the Mazagão Fortress (El Jadida), also classified as World Heritage.

Career
Castilho began working on the Cathedral in Burgos, before advancing to the Cathedral of Seville in his early career. From Seville he was summoned by the Archbishop of Braga, D. Diogo de Sousa, in 1509, to work on the chapel of the Sé Cathedral

Following this period, he worked on the parochial Church of São João Baptista in Vila do Conde, where he lived for a while - the city was thriving economically at the time due to imports-exports activity through its port.  

From Vila do Conde, João de Castilho began working in the Convent of Christ in Tomar. There he executed the celebrated gate and portico to the Church, responding to the beautiful Manueline window produced by Diogo de Arruda. His efforts were rewarded, when he was given the task of managing the public works at the Convent, which he maintained until his death. 

In 1517, he succeeded Diogo Boitaca as director of public works at the Monastery of the Jeronimos, where he designed the extraordinary southern portico (along with Gil Vicente, author of the Belém Monstrance).

He worked on five World Heritage Sites:
 Convent of Christ (Tomar)
 Jerónimos Monastery
 El Jadida
 Batalha Monastery 
 Alcobaça Monastery.

External links
Juan de Castillo at Hermitage

Gallery

1470 births
1552 deaths
Architects from Cantabria
Manueline architects
Portuguese architects
Renaissance architects